Alan Feliksovych Dzutsev (born 24 December 1988) is a professional Ukrainian football player who last played for FC Gazprom transgaz Stavropol Ryzdvyany. He also holds Russian citizenship. Dzutsev is a goalkeeper. His last match for main squad of this team he played on 20 March 2007.

In some sources he is mistaken for the other footballer, Alan Dzutsev from Russia, merging information about both.

References

External links

1988 births
Living people
FC Obolon-Brovar Kyiv players
Ukrainian footballers
Association football goalkeepers